Leopold Grützmacher (born in Dessau, Germany on 4 September 1835, died in Weimar Germany on 26 February 1900) was a German cellist and composer.

He was the younger brother of Friedrich Grützmacher and was a member of the Gewandhaus orchestra in Leipzig. Later he was the principal cellist of the Schwerin Hofkapelle, the Landestheater in Prague and then in the Hofkapelle in Meiningen, Germany. From 1876 he was first cellist and chamber music virtuoso in Weimar.

Grützmacher composed two cello concertos and many small cello pieces. His son Friedrich was also a cellist.

1835 births
1900 deaths
People from Dessau-Roßlau
German classical cellists
19th-century German composers